Andrew Michael Milonakis (born January 30, 1976) is an American comedian, actor, rapper, and internet personality. He is best known for his work on The Andy Milonakis Show, a sketch comedy series that aired on MTV and MTV2 from 2005 to 2007. Other notable films and TV series Milonakis has appeared in include Kroll Show, Waiting... and Adventure Time.

Early life 
Milonakis was born in Katonah, New York, to a Greek-American family. His father was born in Greece. Milonakis was born with a growth hormone deficiency, causing him to have the appearance and voice of an adolescent. He attended John Jay High School in Lewisboro. Milonakis turned to comedy and humor as a preemptive defense mechanism.

Career 
On January 26, 2003, the day of Super Bowl XXXVII, Milonakis decided not to attend a friend's Super Bowl party and instead recorded a video titled "The Super Bowl Is Gay". He posted the video to the website AngryNakedPat.com, and within two weeks it went viral. A writer for ABC's new late-night show, Jimmy Kimmel Live!, spotted it and got Milonakis on the program. At the time, Milonakis was working as a tech support staffer at a Manhattan accounting firm.

Milonakis first started rapping on YouTube; his first song was called "The Andy Milonakis Rap". He was in Three Loco, a group that also included rap artists Dirt Nasty and Riff Raff, but on September 26, 2014, he announced that the group had broken up.

From 2014 to 2015, Milonakis hosted and starred in a cooking show called "Fat Prince" on Munchies, a YouTube channel that is part of the Vice network. In each episode, Milonakis and a changing cast of chefs combined cheap ingredients with expensive ingredients to make a unique meal.

In December 2016, Milonakis announced he was joining the Baited podcast, with YouTubers Anything4views and Keemstar.

On May 30, 2020, Milonakis tweeted the eighth-most-liked tweet of all time on Twitter, writing "Congratulations to the Astronauts that left Earth today. Good choice" referring to the Crew Dragon Demo-2 launch during the George Floyd protests and the COVID-19 pandemic.

Personal life
After having lived in Los Angeles, California for much of his career, he currently lives in Astoria, Queens, New York City.

Discography

EPs
 Gazpacho (2010)

Collaborations
Busboys' Paradise  (2005)
¡Three Loco!  (2012)

Mixtapes
 Hot Soup (2009)

Singles

As lead artist

As featured artist

Guest appearances

Filmography

References

External links

Living people
21st-century American comedians
21st-century American male actors
21st-century American rappers
21st-century American singers
21st-century American male writers
Actors from the New York metropolitan area
American comedy musicians
American male comedians
American male film actors
American male rappers
American male television actors
American male voice actors
American sketch comedians
American television personalities
Male television personalities
American television writers
American writers of Greek descent
Comedians from New York (state)
Male actors from New York (state)
American male television writers
Musicians from the New York metropolitan area
People from Katonah, New York
Rappers from New York (state)
Screenwriters from New York (state)
Twitch (service) streamers
21st-century American male singers
1976 births
John Jay High School (Cross River, New York) alumni
21st-century American screenwriters